Haplogroup D or D-CTS3946 is a Y-chromosome haplogroup. Like its relative distant sibling, haplogroup E-M96, D-CTS3946 has the YAP+ unique-event polymorphism, which defines their parent, haplogroup DE.

Subclades of haplogroup D-CTS3946 are found primarily in East Asia, though they are also found regularly with low frequency in Central Asia and Southeast Asia, and have also been found sporadically in Western Africa and Western Asia.

Overview

Haplogroup D was formerly the name of the D lineage D-M174. Varying proposals exist regarding the origin of haplogroup DE, the parent of D, with some suggesting an African and others an Asian origin. But D-M174 was, and generally is, assumed to be of Asian origin and is exclusively found in Asia.

However, a study by Haber et al. (2019) identified a haplogroup, termed "D0", in three Nigerians. Defined by the SNP A5580.2, "D0" haplogroup is outside M174, but belongs to the D lineage, shares 7 SNPs with it D-M174 that E lacks, and was determined to have diverged early from the D branch (near the D/E split)

Haber et al. considered several possibilities, including an African origin and Asian origin for the haplogroup, but in part because of the deep-rooting of haplogroup "D0", as well as recently calculated early divergence times for it and its parent haplogroup, DE, the authors conclude in favor of an African origin for D0 and DE, as well as for the common ancestor (now known as D-CTS3946 or "D") of D0 and D-M174.

According to Haber et al., D0 is a branch of the DE lineage near the D/E split but on the D branch, diverging around 71,000 years ago. The authors find divergence times for DE*, E, and D0, all likely within a period of about 76,000-71,000 years ago, and a likely date for the exit of the ancestors of modern Eurasians out of Africa (and ensuing Neanderthal admixture) later, at around 50,300-59,400 years ago, which they argue, also supports an African origin for those haplogroups. Thus D-CTS3946 is proposed to have spread both within and outside of Africa: with one branch diverging into D0 in Africa, and another branch that left Africa eventually diverging into D-M174 (i.e. with the M174 mutation later arising from the D-CTS3946 that had spread to Asia).

Subsequently, "D0" has been named "D2", and former D (D-M174) has now also been termed "D1" due to this discovery.
 
Three other samples of D2 were also found (also in 2019) by FTDNA: two in Al Wajh on the west coast of Saudi Arabia and another one in a Syrian (he is D2b-FT51782). A D2b-FT51782 sample was also found in al-Qirbi from Bayda in Yemen that turned out to be several thousands of years related to that of the Syrian. It was announced in 2020 by Michael Sager of FTDNA that another sample had been found in an African American  and one in another African American.  The samples found in the Syrian descendent and in one of the African Americans are to date the most basal samples of D2. The other African American sample shares a branch with the three Nigerians. The recent evidence (as also proposed by Haber et al.) suggests that D2 is a highly divergent haplogroup close to the DE split but on the D branch and lacking the M174 mutation possessed by the other known D lineages (belonging to its sibling D-M174).

A genetic study by Hallast et al. 2020 on ancient and modern haplogroups using a phylogenetic analysis of haplogroup C, D and FT sequences, including very rare deep-rooting lineages (such as D0/D2 sampled by Haber et al. 2019) argues, taking the "rare deep-rooted D0" into account, that the initial splits within haplogroup CT (ancestor of DE) occurred in Africa. They also argue that phylogeographic analyses of ancient and present-day non-African Y chromosomes, all point to East/Southeast Asia as the origin 55,000–50,000 years ago of all known surviving non-African male lineages (apart from recent migrants) soon after an initial 70-55,000 year ago migration from Africa of basal haplogroup D and other basal y-lineages. They argue that these lineages then rapidly expanded across Eurasia, later diversified in southeast Asia and then expanded westwards around 55–50,000 years ago, replacing other local lineages within Eurasia, and conclude that haplogroup D (as D-M174) then underwent rapid expansions within Eastern-Eurasian populations and consists of 5 different branches which formed about 45,000 years ago. They find that these haplogroups currently have their greatest diversity in Eastern Eurasia (east/southeast Asia). Tibeto-Burmese populations of East and Southeast Asia were found to have the highest amount of diversity.

Phylogeny of the subclades
ISOGG (version: 14.151).

DE (YAP) Caribbean, Guinea-Bissau, Tibet, Nigeria
D (CTS3946)
D1 (M174/Page30, IMS-JST021355)
D1a (CTS11577)　
D1a1 (F6251/Z27276)
D1a1a (M15) China (especially Miao, Yi, Tibetans, etc.), Southeast Asia, Mongolia, Central Asia
D1a1a1 (F849)
D1a1a1a (N1)
D1a1a1a1 (Z27269) Japan, China, Tibet
D1a1a1a1a (PH4979)
D1a1a1a1a1 (BY15119/Z29428)
D1a1a1a2 (Z31591) Nepal(Tamang), Kazakhstan, China(Yi)
D1a1a2 (F1070) China, Thailand
D1a1b (P99) Found with high frequency in Tibet and occasionally in other parts of China, Mongolia, Central Asia, and Altai Republic
D1a2(Z3660) 
D1a2a (M64.1/Page44.1, M55) Japan
D1a2a1 (M116.1)
D1a2a2 (CTS131)
D1a2a2a (CTS220)
D1a2a2b (CTS68) Japan(Rebun Island)
D1a2b (Y34637)　Andaman Islands
D1b (L1378) Philippines
D2 (A5580.2) Nigeria, African Americans, Al Wajh in Saudi Arabia, Syria, Yemen

References 

D-M174